Serge Lamothe (born February 15, 1963) is a French-Canadian writer.

Education
He holds a master's degree in literature from Laval University in Quebec City.

Career
He was a member of the board and vice president, in 2005, of UNEQ (Quebec Writers Union). From 2006 to 2015, he was a member of the board of the FIL (International Festival of Literature) in Montreal, Canada.

Theater 
Le Prince de Miguasha, radio play, Radio-Canada, 2003.
Rapports intimes, translation & adaptation of Intimate Exchanges by Alan Ayckbourn, 2003.
Le Procès de Kafka, stage adaptation of The Trial, by Franz Kafka, 2004.
Le fusil de chasse, stage adaptation of The Hunting Gun, by Yasushi Inoue, 2010.
Kinkaku-ji, stage adaptation of The Temple of the Golden Pavilion by Yukio Mishima, directed by Amon Miyamoto, Kanagawa Arts Theatre, Tokyo, and Lincoln Center, NYC, 2011.
Waiting for Godot, by Samuel Beckett, dramatist, directed by François Girard, Théâtre du Nouveau Monde, Montreal, 2016.
Underneath the Lintel, by Glen Berger, dramatist and translation to French (Zebrina – Une pièce à conviction), directed by François Girard, Théâtre du Nouveau Monde and Segal Centre, Montreal, 2020.

Circus 
 2008 Zed, dramatist, Cirque du Soleil, written and directed by François Girard, Tokyo.
 2011 Zarkana, dramatist, Cirque du Soleil, written and directed by François Girard, Radio City Music Hall (NYC), Madrid Arena (Spain), State Kremlin Palace (Moscow) and Aria Resort, Las Vegas.

Opera (with director François Girard) 
 2006 The Seven Deadly Sins & Lindbergh's Flight, dramaturg, libretti by Bertolt Brecht, music by Kurt Weill, Opéra National de Lyon, France.
 2010 Émilie, dramaturg, libretto by Amin Maalouf, music by Kaija Saariaho, Opéra National de Lyon, France.
 2012 Parsifal, dramaturg, libretto and music by Richard Wagner, Opéra national de Lyon, France, Metropolitan Opera, New York (2013).
 2019 The Flying Dutchman, (Der Fliegende Holländer), dramaturg, libretto and music by Richard Wagner, Grand Théâtre de Québec.
 2020 The Flying Dutchman, (Der Fliegende Holländer), dramaturg, libretto and music by Richard Wagner, Metropolitan Opera, New York.
 2022 Lohengrin (opera), dramaturg, libretto and music by Richard Wagner, Bolshoi Theatre, Moscow.
 2023 Lohengrin (opera), dramaturg, libretto and music by Richard Wagner, Metropolitan Opera, New York.

Bibliography 
La longue portée, novel, L'instant même, Quebec, (1998). 
La tierce personne, novel, L'instant même, Quebec, (2000). 
L'ange au berceau, novel, L'instant même, Quebec, (2002). 
Les Baldwin, novel, L'instant même, Quebec, (2004). 
The Baldwins, novel, (English translation by Fred A. Reed & David Homel), Talonbooks, Vancouver, (2006). 
Tu n'as que ce sang, poetry, Mémoire d'encrier, Montreal, (2005). 
Le Procès de Kafka et Le Prince de Miguasha, theater, Alto, Quebec, (2005). 
Tarquimpol, novel, Alto, Quebec, (2007). 
Métarevers, novel, Coups de tête, Montreal, (2009). 
Projet Perfecto, short story, Alto, Quebec, (2010). 
Les Urbanishads, poetry, Le lézard amoureux, Quebec, (2010). 
Le nid de l'aigle, short stories, (photos by Sébastien Cliche) J'Ai Vu, Quebec, (2010). 
Les Enfants lumière, novel, Alto, Quebec, (2012). 
Ma terre est un fond d'océan, poetry, Mémoire d'encrier, Montreal, (2016) 
 Mi tierra es un fondo de océano, poetry, (Spanish translation by Evelio Miñano Martinez), La Lucerna, Palma de Mallorca, (2023) 
Mektoub, novel, Alto, Quebec, (2016). 
 Oshima, novel, Alto, Quebec, (2019) 
 Oshima, novel, (Spanish translation by Evelio Miñano Martinez) Editorial Verbum, Madrid, (2021) 
 Des nouvelles de la posthistoire, short stories, Le Lys Bleu, Paris, France, (2021) 
 Les Urbanishads et autres poèmes, poetry (with drawings by the author) Stellamaris, Brest, France (2021)

Awards
2003 Yves-Thériault Award from Radio-Canada for The Prince of Miguasha, author
2006 Herald Angels Award for Best production Edinburgh International Festival, pour Die sieben TodsündenThe Seven Deadly Sins, directed by François Girard, dramaturg
2008 Prix des libraires du Québec for the novel Tarquimpol, finalist
2011 Kinokuniya Theatre Prize for Hunting Gun, Japan, stage adaptation
2011 Yomiuri Prize for Hunting Gun, Japan, stage adaptation
2012 Prix du Syndicat de la critique, Prix Claude Rostand, for Parsifal, Lyon, France, dramaturg
2014 Diapason d'or from Diapason for the DVD of Parsifal at the MET, dramaturg
2016 Prix littéraire des collégiens for the novel Mektoub, finalist
2019 Prix Opus, Concert of the year for Richard Wagner's Der Fliegende Holländer, Opera Festival of Québec, dramaturg
2020 Prix des Horizons imaginaires for the novel Oshima, finalist

References

External links 
 Official site
 Reviews of Lamothe's work
 

1963 births
Living people
20th-century French dramatists and playwrights
21st-century French dramatists and playwrights
20th-century French novelists
21st-century French novelists
French poets
Université Laval alumni
French male poets
French male novelists
Writers from Quebec City
20th-century French translators
20th-century French male writers
21st-century French male writers
French male non-fiction writers